Skipped Parts is a 2000 American coming of age comedy-drama film directed by Tamra Davis. The film stars Jennifer Jason Leigh, Bug Hall, Mischa Barton, Brad Renfro and Drew Barrymore, reprising her role from Motorama.

After making the film-festival rounds in 2000, the film had a limited release by Trimark Pictures. It was filmed in Indian Head, Saskatchewan, Regina, Saskatchewan, Fort Qu'Appelle, Saskatchewan and Regina Beach, Saskatchewan.

Plot 
In 1963, liberal-minded and reckless Lydia Callahan is raising her 14-year-old son, Sam. Lydia's father Caspar, a prominent local businessman, is running for governor of North Carolina, and does not want Lydia and Sam in his way, so the two are banished from North Carolina. They travel across the country and settle in Wyoming, where Lydia only wants to have a good time and refuses to allow Sam to call her "mom."

Sam soon finds out that he is one of only two students in Gro Vont High School who read. The other one is Maurey, a girl the same age as Sam who wants to learn about sex. Consequent to their mutual discoveries, Maurey becomes pregnant. She decides to have an abortion in a distant hospital, and by accident, runs into her mother and the baseball coach who is also there with the same intent.

After that Maurey moves in with Lydia and Sam since her father banished her from his house. Meanwhile, Hank Elkrunner, a Blackfoot, falls for the feckless Lydia, while her dictatorial dad keeps tabs on them all from afar.

In the end, Maurey decides not to have an abortion and keeps the baby, a little girl named Shannon. After being threatened to be financially cut off unless she breaks up with Hank, and lets Sam go to Military School, Lydia decides to stay with Hank, and takes a job at the local diner. In addition, Hank sells his trailer and moves in with Sam and Lydia, along with Maurey and Shannon who decide to permanently move in. The film ends with Sam finishing the flashback for the story, with Shannon nearby.

Throughout the film, Sam has many dream fantasies that Drew Barrymore serves as the subject of his fantasies.

Cast

Production
Though set in Wyoming, the film was shot in Saskatchewan, Canada in the summer of 1999.

Release
The film premiered at the Seattle International Film Festival on June 6, 2000. It was later released in the United States on January 5, 2001.

Home media
Trimark Home Entertainment released the film on DVD in June 26, 2001.

Censorship
In the film, there are some private scenes which are rated +19 and some banned nudity and sexual scenes, in the clip scene of a couple removing their clothes and exposing their undergarments, in another clip scene Maurey and Sam removing their underwear while the scene is removed for strict age.

Critical reception

Accolades

References

External links 
 
 
 

2001 films
American comedy-drama films
American coming-of-age films
2001 romantic comedy films
Films directed by Tamra Davis
Films shot in Saskatchewan
Films set in 1963
Films set in Wyoming
Teenage pregnancy in film
Films scored by Stewart Copeland
Trimark Pictures films
Films about mother–son relationships
Films about abortion
Juvenile sexuality in films
2000s English-language films
2000s American films